Joseph H. Stewart State Recreation Area is a state park located  on the Rogue River approximately  from Crater Lake National Park and  northeast of Medford in Jackson County, southern Oregon. It is administered by the Oregon Parks and Recreation Department. Campsites are provided overlooking the  Lost Creek Reservoir.

See also
 List of Oregon state parks

References

External links
 
 

State parks of Oregon
Parks in Jackson County, Oregon
Rogue River (Oregon)